Dang-e Nim (also Romanized as Dāng-e Nīm; also known as Downgeh Nīm and Dūngeh Nīm) is a village in Derakhtengan Rural District, in the Central District of Kerman County, Kerman Province, Iran. At the 2006 census, its population was 69, in 24 families.

References 

Populated places in Kerman County